Thomas Wayne Butler (born April 9, 1944) is a politician, and member of the Alabama Senate. He represents the 2nd District as a member of the Republican Party. Senate District 2 encompasses east Limestone County and western Madison County. It includes the cities of Athens, Huntsville and Madison.

Biography
Prior to his term in the Alabama Senate, Butler served in the Alabama House of Representatives from 1982 through 1994.

Butler graduated from the University of Alabama and then from Auburn University. He works as a pharmacist and health underwriter. He is a member of Optimist International, the North Alabama Health Underwriters Association, and the Alabama Pharmaceutical Association.

Butler was an early supporter of making automated external heart defibrillators (AED) widely available in Alabama. He sponsored legislation to place such devices in all Alabama public schools.

Butler was the original sponsor of the Anti-Obscenity Enforcement Act of 1998, a statute that prohibits the sale of sex toys. Originally intended to prohibit nude dancing, the statute has subsequently become the target of controversy and litigation.

Butler sponsored and helped pass the Dixon-Butler Permanent Contract Review Act, which created a Contract Review Permanent Legislative Oversight Committee to review certain state contracts. This legislation aimed to ensure that ethical standards were upheld in state contracts issued by the Administrative branch. Butler served as chair, and vice chair, of this oversight committee.

Butler sponsored legislation to construct two State Veterans Nursing Homes (in Huntsville and Bay Minette). He worked to fund the Veterans Memorial in Birmingham, the Veteran's Museum and Archives in Athens, the establishment of the Veterans Living Legacy at the American Village at Montevallo, and the creation of Alabama's Veterans Assistance Fund.

Butler authored legislation that allowed the city of Madison to establish its own school system. This system has gained national attention for some of its schools.

Butler served on several committees during his House and Senate terms. His Senate assignments included the following:
Agriculture, Conservation and Forestry Committee, Alabama Senate
Children, Youth Affairs, and Human Resources Committee, Alabama Senate Chairperson
Commerce, Transportation, and Utilities Committee, Alabama Senate
Finance and Taxation Education Committee, Alabama Senate
Finance and Taxation General Fund, Alabama Senate
Health Committee, Alabama Senate Deputy Chairperson
Local Legislation No. 1 Committee, Alabama Senate
Industrial Development and Recruitment Committee, Alabama Senate
Rules Committee, Alabama Senate

In May 2019, he voted to make abortion a crime at any stage in a pregnancy, with no exemptions for cases of rape or incest.

In March 2019, he voted to increase gasoline taxes by 10 cents per gallon over three years, up to 28 cents per gallon an effective tax increase of 55% over the previous rate of 18 cents per gallon.

In March 2020, he voted against the legalization of medical cannabis. The bill passed the Senate 22–11.

See also
 List of American politicians who switched parties in office

References

External links
Project Vote Smart - Senator Tom Butler (AL) profile
Political profile at Bama Politics
Follow the Money - Tom Butler
2006 2002 1998 campaign contributions

Alabama state senators
Members of the Alabama House of Representatives
1944 births
Living people
Politicians from Huntsville, Alabama
Auburn University alumni
University of Alabama alumni
Alabama Democrats
Alabama Republicans
21st-century American politicians